The Dubai International Film Festival (DIFF) is the largest film festival in the Arab region.  With particular emphasis on showcasing Arab, Asian, and African cinema, it also helps to develop industry and talent in the region. is held in Dubai in the United Arab Emirates.

The Muhr Awards, including the Muhr AsiaAfrica Awards, are the main festival awards.

History
The inaugural Dubai International Film Festival took place in 2004, when it screened 76 films.

At its 5th edition in 2008, DIFF ran its first Asia Africa section. My Secret Sky, a South African film in the Zulu language directed by Madoda Ncayiyana, opened the section. The festival featured 181 films from 66 countries, and the red carpet event included Goldie Hawn, Ben Affleck, Danny Glover, Oliver Stone, and Harry Belafonte. The grand prize went to Masquerades (film), directed by Algerian director Lyes Salem.

The 9th edition of the festival took place in December 2012, and featured films from the Philippines, China, Turkiye, Angola and Senegal.

In 2014 DIFF screened a line-up of 118 feature films, shorts and documentaries from around the world including 55 world premieres and international premieres. Opening the 2014 Festival was the Oscar-nominated The Theory of Everything, directed by James Marsh and starring Eddie Redmayne and Felicity Jones.

The 12th edition of DIFF took place in December 2015. At that time, the festival director was Shivani Pandya.

For its 14th edition in 2017, the festival screened 141 films from around the world, and by that time was the biggest film festival in the region.

In 2018, the DIFF announced it would take place every two years, with the 15th edition confirmed for 2019.

Overview
The DIFF is held under the patronage of the Crown Prince of Dubai, Sheikh Mohammed Bin Rashid Al Maktoum, who is prime minister, vice president and ruler of Dubai. As of 2015 the festival was presented by Dubai Media City. It is a not-for-profit cultural event.

It showcases films from the Arab, Asian and African cinema industries, and helps to develop talent and the film industry in the region.

, South-African born Nashen Moodley is director of the Asia and Africa Programmes and oversees the Muhr AsiaAfrica competition. He was the founder of the Muhr Awards for Excellence in Asia Africa Cinema.

The festival also established the Dubai Film Market and Dubai Film Connection to be held concurrently, to raise the profile of local directors and enhance careers of film professionals.

Awards
The festival is known for its Muhr Awards. These include the Muhr AsiaAfrica Awards, Muhr Arab Awards and Muhr Emirati Awards, with section awarding prizes for best film, documentary, short film, etc.

FIPRESCI Awards for feature, short and documentary films are also given at the festival.

References

External links
 Archived August 2021, last festival 15th edition, with the words "We'll be back soon!" (website now defunct)
DIFF on IMDb

Recurring events established in 2004
Film festivals in the United Arab Emirates
Festivals in the United Arab Emirates
International Film Festival
International Film Festival
Film markets
2004 establishments in the United Arab Emirates